Thomas Wyllie (5 April 1870 – 28 July 1943) was a Scottish footballer who played for Rangers, Everton, Liverpool, Bury and Bristol City.

He made four Scottish Football League appearances for Rangers in the competition's first season, 1890–91, then after moving south in December 1890, featured in the same number of fixtures for Everton in the English Football League  – both clubs won their respective championships, but it is not clear if he would have been awarded a medal by either. Moving to Liverpool in 1892, he was one of their earliest players, prior to their promotion to the Football League. He later won the Second Division title with Bury in 1895 and was in the side which defeated his old club Liverpool in a play-off to gain promotion to the top tier, where he played for two seasons. His spell at Bristol City took place during their time in the Southern League.

Wyllie represented Scotland once in 1890.

References

External links

1870 births
1943 deaths
Scottish footballers
Scotland international footballers
People from Maybole
Footballers from South Ayrshire
Rangers F.C. players
Liverpool F.C. players
Everton F.C. players
Bury F.C. players
Scottish Football League players
English Football League players
Southern Football League players
Bristol City F.C. players
Association football outside forwards
Scottish football referees